The American Legion Post No. 127 Building is a historic meeting hall at the corner of Cherry and Armstrong Streets in Eudora, Arkansas.  The single story vertical log building was built in 1934 by the Works Progress Administration in Rustic architecture style.  The building has retained much of its interior and exterior finish.

The building was listed on the National Register of Historic Places in 1992.

See also
National Register of Historic Places listings in Chicot County, Arkansas

References

Clubhouses on the National Register of Historic Places in Arkansas
Cultural infrastructure completed in 1934
Buildings and structures in Chicot County, Arkansas
American Legion buildings
Rustic architecture in Arkansas
National Register of Historic Places in Chicot County, Arkansas
Eudora, Arkansas
1934 establishments in Arkansas